In Honour of Icon E is a tribute album to Norwegian black metal band Emperor, released on June 25, 2012.

Reception
The album received positive reviews from heavy metal outlets and received praises from the members of Emperor. Metal.de stated that, among "a whole flood of unnecessary and useless publications", In Honour of Icon E is "really essential", further stating that the mix of "lesser known Eastern Bloc bands and [...] bigger Scandinavian names seems a bit strange at first, but makes the sampler colorful". Chris Popp, writing for musikreviews.de, concluded that the album is "one of the better homage compilations", although mainly of interest to "die-hard Emperor fans".

In a review for Metal Kaoz, Minos Dokopoulos called In Honour of Icon E "an excellent tribute album", while heavymetal.dk considered this tribute to be "one of the better ones", commenting that "the respective cover artists very often capture the atmosphere and compositional musical sublimity that Emperor's music was/is an expression of".

Track listing

References

2012 albums
Tribute albums